Viscount , a.k.a.  was a Japanese Shishi, and later, a diplomat. 
He attended a battle in the 1860s at Chōshū Domain. Especially, in 1865, he was the commander in Kōzan-ji uprising, as Hirobumi Ito, under Shinsaku Takasugi. He also served at the Second Chōshū expedition, and led the Chōshū Army to win.

In the 1870s served as Japanese Minister to Rome. In 1876 concluded successfully negotiations with Italian sculptor Vincenzo Ragusa to take a teaching position at the newly opened government sponsored art school in Tokyo. Served as Japanese Consul in London in 1884-1893. In 1894, Kawase became a member of the Privy Council till his death.

References

Japanese diplomats
1840 births
1919 deaths